Soma (stylized as SOMA) is a survival horror video game developed and published by Frictional Games. The game was released on 22 September 2015 for Microsoft Windows, OS X, Linux, and PlayStation 4, and on 1 December 2017 on Xbox One.

Soma takes place on an underwater remote research facility containing machinery that exhibits human characteristics, such as consciousness. Simon Jarrett, a fish-out-of-water protagonist, finds himself there under mysterious circumstances and embarks upon discovering its history, while trying to make sense of his predicament and potential future.

Somas gameplay builds on the conventions established in the previous horror titles of Frictional Games, including an emphasis on stealthy evasion of threats, puzzle-solving, and immersion (i.e., what has been called a "walking simulator"). However, in a break with this tradition, it also de-emphasizes aspects such as inventory management in favour of a tighter focus on narrative. Soma received generally favorable reviews from critics, who praised its story and voice acting, but criticized its enemy design and encounters.

Gameplay 
Soma is a survival horror video game played from a first-person perspective. The player will encounter a number of creatures, which each embody an aspect of the game's themes. Throughout Soma, the player will find a large array of clues, such as notes and audio tapes, which builds atmosphere and furthers the plot. Similar to most titles by Frictional Games, the player progresses through puzzle-solving, exploration, and the use of stealth; the player may die if they fail to avoid monsters, although two years after the initial release, a "Safe Mode" has been added that keeps the monsters but stops them from killing the player.
This type of gameplay has been called a "walking simulator".

Plot

Setting
Soma takes place in an underwater research facility known as PATHOS-II in the year 2104. While the station itself has fallen into disrepair by the start of the game, PATHOS-II was a sophisticated research outpost located in the North Atlantic Ocean. Originally established as a thermal mining operation in the 2060s by Japanese conglomerate Haimatsu and European conglomerate Carthage Industries, the facility's primary purpose shifted to space technology and operation of the Omega Space Gun – an electromagnetic railgun designed to launch satellites and other small equipment into orbit without the cost or risks of traditional rockets. All operations and maintenance on PATHOS-II are overseen by the Warden Unit (WAU), an artificial general intelligence integrated with all computer systems in the facility.

The crew of PATHOS-II unexpectedly became the last people to exist on Earth after a major extinction event caused by a comet striking the planet. There, the last humans survived on a day-to-day basis, attempting to fight the negative effects of their collective isolation, as well as other issues that began to pose a threat to their well-being.

Story
In 2015, Simon Jarrett survives a car accident, but sustains severe brain damage and cranial bleeding. Due to his injuries, Simon agrees to undergo an experimental brain scan under the control of graduate student David Munshi. During the scan, Simon appears to black out, and regains consciousness on Site Upsilon of PATHOS-II, an apparently-abandoned geothermal power center. Exploring Upsilon, Simon makes contact with a woman named Catherine Chun, who invites him to Site Lambda and reveals that he is currently in the year 2104, one year after a comet devastated the Earth and left PATHOS-II as the final known outpost of humanity. When the communication platform Simon is in floods, he briefly blacks out and awakens to discover that he is inside a diving suit. Exploring the seabed around Site Upsilon, he manages to find a working train and uses it to travel to Site Lambda. Throughout the journey, Simon encounters hostile robots that believe they are human.

Arriving at Site Lambda, Simon discovers that Catherine is not human, but a brain scan of a PATHOS-II employee downloaded into a storage unit of a robot. Simon himself is the result of his brain scan from 2015 being uploaded into the modified corpse of another PATHOS-II employee by an artificial intelligence named the Warden Unit (WAU), which took control of the center and turned all the surviving humans into bio-mechanical mutants to fulfill its task of preserving humanity. The sole means of anything of human origin escaping Earth is the ARK, a digital black box designed by Catherine that houses a simulated world in which the brain scans of all the PATHOS-II personnel have been preserved. Despite its completion, the ARK has not yet been sent into space. Simon agrees to aid Catherine in recovering the ARK and completing her mission.

As the ARK is kept in the Tau site at the absolute depths of the Atlantic Ocean, Simon heads toward the Theta site to retrieve a submarine named DUNBAT that can withstand the abyssal pressure. However, the WAU has preemptively tampered with the DUNBAT, forcing Simon to make his way to the Omicron site to create a new body capable of traveling through the seabed. While searching for the essential components at Site Omicron, Simon receives mental messages from a WAU-converted but still sane artificial intelligence specialist, Johan Ross, who begs him to destroy the WAU. Upon the completion of Simon's new body, Catherine copies Simon's consciousness into it, resulting in Simon having to choose between euthanizing the Simon in his old body or leaving him to whatever fate befalls him.

Descending into the abyss, Simon braves the now mutated fauna of the Abyss and retrieves the ARK from Site Tau and takes it toward Site Phi, where the Omega space cannon is located. However, he is forced to take a detour through Site Alpha, where the WAU's core is located. Here, Ross reveals to Simon that the structural gel with which he created his new body was designed by Ross to poison and destroy the WAU, and that his colleagues refused to use it in time. Ross gives Simon the opportunity to eliminate the WAU, while secretly planning to kill him to prevent the WAU from adapting to Simon's immunity. Before he can do so, Ross is devoured by a mutated aquatic leviathan, from which Simon escapes by reaching the Phi site.

At the Phi site, Catherine copies Simon's and her brain scans into the ARK at the last moment before it is launched into space. When Simon is confused as to why the two remain despite their accomplishment, Catherine explains that it is their copies that are on the ARK; they argue about the nature of their mission until Catherine's cortex chip short-circuits from overexertion, effectively killing her. Simon is left helpless and alone in the darkness of the abyss.

In a post-credits scene, the version of Simon copied to the ARK awakes and reunites with Catherine in an idyllic landscape. Meanwhile, the ARK drifts off into space and leaves the devastated Earth behind.

Development 

Soma was in the making since 2010, beginning with the advancement of new technology for the game engine. Setting the game at the bottom of the Atlantic Ocean was an idea decided on a "whim" by Frictional Games co-founders Thomas Grip and Jens Nilsson, which Grip said they had wanted to try for a long time. At some point in development, the story of the game underwent a number of major changes before ending up at the final version that was released, with an older build released via an easter egg. The storytelling was designed to rely on the player's actions rather than serve as a guide for the player to adhere to, so as to allow those who ignore exposition material, such as audio logs and notes, to follow the plot. Somas underlying theme is consciousness, and was developed in order to explore the nature of free will and the self. The game's atmosphere was inspired by the work of Philip K. Dick, China Miéville and Greg Egan.

Achieving a realistic sound to fit the mood required audio director Samuel Justice to utilise what he called "the room size system". Instead of processing sounds to make an effect possible, recordings were made of environments that complemented such needs, like the reverb of a large hall. With this system, over 2,000 footstep sounds were captured.

Marketing 
A teaser trailer featuring gameplay footage of Soma was released on 11 October 2013. The official website's info page displays a quote by author Philip K. Dick. Another trailer of the game was released in April 2014.

Two live action shorts, "Vivarium" and "Mockingbird" were shot back-to-back at LeftJet Studios in Seattle, over the course of nine days. The films were produced by Imagos Films, an independent film company based in Seattle. Imagos Films also completed for Frictional Games a set of live action clips that were set to release in 2015 in monthly installments and would connect to the story of the upcoming game. Due to production problems the release date was delayed and on 28 September, shortly after the release of the game, Frictional Games announced they had made available the first clip on their YouTube channel under the title "SOMA - Transmission #1", with seven more to follow in each coming day. The live action miniseries acts as a prequel to the events of the game, albeit one which is inspired by its plot and characters rather than being strictly canonical to it.

In collaboration with Frictional Games, a feature film tentatively called "DEPTH" was filmed by Imagos Films under the code name "Project Apophis". The film's director is Don Thacker and clips from it were used for Soma'''s marketing campaign, such as the "Transmissions" webseries. The film stars Trin Miller, Josh Truax, and Rachelle Henry, and was expected to release in 2016.

 Reception Soma received "generally favorable reviews" according to review aggregator website Metacritic.

Richard Wakeling from GameSpot gave the game a 9 out of 10, and praised the "engaging and thought-provoking" story, the "impressive" writing and voice acting, and the atmosphere and sound design, which together, fills the game with "dread" and provides a "chilling", "edge of your seat" feeling. However, Wakeling disliked the sections in which the player walks on the ocean floor, calling them "dull, plodding affairs" and "incredibly linear". Philip Kollar of Polygon also gave the game a 9/10 and wrote: "I don't know if SOMA will scare people as much as Amnesia did, but it is without a doubt a stronger game, with better pacing, smarter writing and more powerful subject matter. This isn't a horror game about obfuscation; events aren't building to a huge, shocking twist. More than anything, it's about the process of dealing with the horror of reality." Caitlin Cooke from Destructoid awarded the game a 9/10 as well. She stated "SOMA gets everything right about the survival horror genre. It’s like someone created the perfect video game mixtape -- a little bit of abandoned underwater atmosphere from BioShock, detailed environments a la Gone Home, and (of course) the frenzied monster mechanics from Amnesia. Even if you dislike non-combat-oriented games, I dare you to give it a try."

Tim Turi from Game Informer awarded the game an 8.5 out of 10. He commended the sound for convincingly immersing the player in the game, as well as the "eerie" environments, the "simple", "reliable" controls, and the "intriguing" narrative. In his review for GamesRadar, Leon Hurley wrote: "A disturbingly different take on interesting sci-fi concepts let down by a slow start ... but worth it overall." Hurley praised the "great" story, "likeable" characters, and the "interesting and unpredictable" locations. He also commended the game for its ability to pull the player through the story by providing rewarding situations, although Hurley did feel "lost" at times, as there are no distinct directions. IGN's Daniel Krupa scored the game an 8.1/10 and wrote: "SOMA is a sustained exploration of an original and thought-provoking idea. The concept of artificial intelligence has been explored by lots of science fiction, so it isn’t unique in that regard, but it makes particularly intelligent use of video game conventions to present those familiar ideas in new and surprising ways."

Criticism of Soma focused on the implementation and design of its enemies. While Cooke generally enjoyed the monster encounters and their "unique and frightening" designs, she felt disappointed that there were only a few different types, most of which only made one appearance in the game. Turi found that the cat and mouse gameplay of stealthily evading monsters now felt "formulaic" in the genre and "required patience". Wakeling wrote that while the encounters were necessary to provide adversity, he felt they were otherwise "tedious" and found himself "clambering to get back to the story." Hurley wrote that the monsters lacked "threat" and "never really deliver ... they’re little more than dumb ambulatory obstacles", being overcome by the player "looping around behind them, or slipping past while they obediently investigate thrown objects." Alex Avard of GamesRadar praised the game's "Safe Mode" update from 2017 that decreased the threat of the monsters, having felt they were originally "unwelcome interruptions to an otherwise enthralling mystery", but instead in Safe Mode gave the "high minded story the space it always needed to breath". He wrote that the enemies' typically passive behavior and discernible forms improved the game's atmosphere and themes while allowing him to fully engage in the narrative, writing: "I’m no longer beset with frustrated paranoia or constantly distracted by my own survival instincts. Instead, my attention is entirely focused on engaging with Simon’s personal journey and learning more about the history of PATHOS-II".

After ten days of release, Soma had sold 92,000 copies, exceeding the 20,000 copies made by the developer's previous game Amnesia: The Dark Descent in its first week. In March 2016, Frictional Games announced that the game had sold more than 250,000 copies and that the company was close to breaking even, which required them to sell 276,000 units. In a blog post commemorating one year of release, Frictional Games estimated that the sales figures had exceeded 450,000 copies. By March 2021, 1 million copies were sold on PC alone. At the 2016 Golden Joystick Awards, Soma'' was nominated for three categories: Best Original Game, Best Story Telling and Best Visual Design. In 2018, GamesRadar ranked the game 8th in their list of "the 20 best horror games of all time".

See also
 Digital immortality
 Mind uploading
 Metaverse
 Philosophical zombie
 Posthuman
 Posthumanism
 Simulated reality
 Simulated reality in fiction
 Teletransportation paradox
 Transhumanism
 Turing test

References

External links 

 

2015 video games
Dystopian video games
Existentialist video games
Fiction about consciousness transfer
Fictional works set in the Atlantic Ocean
Video games about impact events
Indie video games
Linux games
MacOS games
PlayStation 4 games
PlayStation Network games
Post-apocalyptic video games
2010s horror video games
Science fiction video games
Video games with Steam Workshop support
Video games with underwater settings
Survival video games
Swedish speculative fiction works
Transhumanism in video games
Video games developed in Sweden
Video games scored by Mikko Tarmia
Video games set in 2015
Video games set in the 22nd century
Video games set in Toronto
Windows games
Xbox One games